The Eurovision Young Musicians 1986 was the third edition of the Eurovision Young Musicians, held at the Koncerthuset, in Copenhagen, Denmark on 27 May 1986. Organised by the European Broadcasting Union (EBU) and host broadcaster Danmarks Radio (DR), musicians from five countries participated in the televised final. Despite the contest being held in Copenhagen, host country Denmark failed to qualify for the final alongside Germany, Austria, Israel, Belgium, Norway, Ireland, Sweden, Netherlands and Italy. The participant artists could not be older than 19 by the time of the contest. The finalists were all accompanied by the Danish Radio Symphony Orchestra under the leadership of Hans Graf.

France's Sandrine Lazarides won the contest, with Switzerland and Finland placing second and third respectively.

Location

The Koncerthuset at Radiohuset in Copenhagen, Denmark, was the host venue for the 1986 edition of the Eurovision Young Musicians.

Radiohuset (literally "Radio House") is the former headquarters of national Danish broadcaster DR, located on Rosenørns Allé in Frederiksberg, Copenhagen. The building complex was inaugurated in 1945 to a Functionalist design by Vilhelm Lauritzen and later expanded in 1958 and 1972. Vacated by DR when DR Byen was inaugurated in 2006, the buildings now house the Royal Danish Academy of Music as well as the Museum of Music. The complex also contains a 1,200-seat concert hall, Koncerthuset.

Format
Anette Faaborg was the host of the 1986 contest. Each participating country were able to send male or female artists who were no older than 19 years of age, to represent them by playing a classical piece of their choice, accompanied by the Danish Radio Symphony Orchestra under the leadership of Hans Graf. The winner and runner-up of the previous edition, Isabelle van Keulen and Olli Mustonen respectively, performed "Suite Italienne" during the interval.

Results

Preliminary round
A total of fifteen countries took part in the preliminary round of the 1986 contest, of which five qualified to the televised grand final. The following countries failed to qualify.

 
 
  (host)

Final
Awards were given to the top three countries. The table below highlights these using gold, silver, and bronze. The placing results of the remaining participants is unknown and never made public by the European Broadcasting Union.

Jury members
The jury members consisted of the following:

Preliminary round

  – Franz Wagner
  – Fud Leclerc
  – Mogens Andersen
  – Anna-Karina Bentley
  – Serge Kaufmann
  – Richard Jakoby
  – Jane Carty
  – Ávi Hannáni
  – Ilio Catani
  – Ton Hartsuiker
  – Robbert Jan de Neeve
  – Jan Eriksen
  – Michel Dami
  – Sten Andersson
  – John Manduall
  – Seadeta Midžić

Final

 / – Carole Dawn Reinhart
  – Georges Dumortier
  – Poul Birkelund
  – Hannu-Ilari Lampila
  – Teresa Llacuna
  – Siegried Palm
  – Claudio Scimone (head juror)
  – Ton Hartsuiker
  – Björn Liljequist
  – Sir David Willcocks
  – Jasna Nemec Novak

Broadcasting
EBU members from the following countries broadcast the final round. Portugal broadcast the contest in addition to the competing countries.

Other countries
 – Portuguese broadcaster RTP attempted to take part, but were forced to withdraw as it had been unable to provide a "qualified candidate".

See also
 Eurovision Song Contest 1986

References

External links 
 

Eurovision Young Musicians by year
1986 in music
1986 in Denmark
Music festivals in Denmark
Events in Copenhagen
May 1986 events in Europe